Arend Martijn Slot (born 17 September 1978) is a Dutch professional football coach and former player who is the manager of Feyenoord.

Playing career
Slot played as midfielder for PEC Zwolle, NAC Breda and Sparta Rotterdam.

Coaching career
Slot begun his coaching career in 2013, working as a youth coach at PEC Zwolle for a year, before being appointed as an assistant coach at Cambuur, a position he held until 2017.

AZ 
Slot was hired by AZ as an assistant to John van den Brom, before being promoted to head coach in 2019. In his first season in charge, the Eredivisie was cancelled midway due to the COVID-19 pandemic. AZ came in second based on goal difference, although no winner was determined. On December 5, 2020, he was sacked as head coach of AZ for not being focused on the team, having recently negotiated a deal with Feyenoord, despite earning 2.11 points per game in the Eredivisie, the highest of any AZ-coach in history.

Feyenoord 
On 15 December 2020, Feyenoord announced that the club had reached a deal with Slot for him to become the club's new coach from the start of the 2021–22 season in Eredivisie. The deal would see Slot sign for two years, with Feyenoord having the option to extend his contract for a third year. At Feyenoord, Slot succeeded the experienced Dick Advocaat, who led the team to a fifth place in the Eredivisie and qualification to the UEFA Conference League Qualifiers. Slot was appointed to build a new team with a recognisable playing style. Marino Pusic was appointed as his first assistant coach, while John de Wolf was retained as second assistant coach. Robin van Persie was added to his staff as a field coach.

At the end of this first season, 2021–22, Slot was awarded the Rinus Michels Award for the Eredivisie Manager of the Year beating off Erik ten Hag (Ajax), Ron Jans (FC Twente), Joseph Oosting (RKC Waalwijk) and Kees van Wonderen (Go Ahead Eagles).

Managerial statistics

Honours

Player
Zwolle
Eerste Divisie: 2001–02, 2011–12

Manager
Feyenoord
 UEFA Europa Conference League runner-up: 2021–22
Individual

 Rinus Michels Award: 2021–22

References

External links
Arne Slot at Sparta Rotterdam
Arne Slot at Voetbal International 

1978 births
Living people
People from Hardenberg
Association football midfielders
Dutch footballers
PEC Zwolle players
NAC Breda players
Sparta Rotterdam players
Eredivisie players
Eerste Divisie players
Dutch football managers
Association football coaches
PEC Zwolle non-playing staff
AZ Alkmaar non-playing staff
AZ Alkmaar managers
Feyenoord managers
Eredivisie managers
Footballers from Overijssel